Columbus High School (CHS), also known as Columbus Catholic High School, is a Catholic high school in Waterloo, Iowa. Columbus High School is located in the Roman Catholic Archdiocese of Dubuque and is part of the Cedar Valley Catholic School system.

History 
Columbus High School opened its doors to a class of 406 boys and 431 girls on 31 August 1959, following a three-year fund-raising effort. The school's primary advocate, Father A.A. McAvoy, began directing fundraising efforts in 1956. By 1959, McAvoy's efforts had yielded nearly two million dollars in pledges. In 1958 the cornerstone was blessed by Archbishop Leo Binz. Father John Paar was named principal later that year and served for 10 years. In 1968, Father Walter Brunkan, the assistant principal, was promoted to principal and remained in that role for over 20 years. In 1991 he was reassigned to St. Mary Catholic Church in Greene, Iowa, and Michael Palmer became the first lay principal. Palmer retired in 1999, and assistant principal Todd Dirth became principal, serving from 1999 until December 2003.  John Carlucci served as the interim principal the remainder of that school year, and Richard Caye served as the principal for the 2004/2005 school year. The current principal, Tom Ulses, was appointed in 2005. The Columbus High School campus now also includes Blessed Maria Assunta Pallotta Catholic Middle School, serving grades 6 through 8. The middle school was established in August 2012, drawing students from Blessed Sacrament, Sacred Heart and St. Edward elementary schools.

Athletics 
The Sailors compete in the North Iowa Cedar League Conference in the following sports:

Bowling
Cross Country (boys and girls)
 Boys' 3-time State Champions (1969, 1971, 1972)
Volleyball 
Football
 3-time State Champions (1976, 1986, 2004)
Basketball (boys and girls)
Girls' 1990 State Champions  
Wrestling 
 2004 Class 2A State Champions
Track and Field (boys and girls)
Golf (boys and girls)
 Boys' 8-time State Champions (1969, 1987, 1999, 2000, 2002, 2004, 2012, 2013)
 Coed State Champions - 1969
Baseball (boys)
Softball (girls)
Soccer (boys and girls)
 Boys' 2012 Class 1A State Champions
Tennis (boys and girls)
 Boys' 2010 Class 1A State Champions
 Girls' 15-time State Champions (1984, 1985, 1986, 1988, 1989, 1992, 1995, 2001, 2002, 2004, 2005, 2006, 2007, 2011, 2013)

Notable alumni
 Dr. Tim Cordes, a blind American physician	
 Tracie Spencer – 1994, American singer-songwriter, actress and model. 
 Chris Klieman- Kansas State football coach.
Larry Nemmers – 1960, NFL referee.
 Michael Hogan – 1961, Educator and educator administrator. Former president of the University of Illinois, University of Connecticut and the University of Iowa.
 Raja Chari - NASA Astronaut and Test Pilot

See also
List of high schools in Iowa

References

External links 
 Official school web site

Catholic secondary schools in Iowa
Private high schools in Iowa
Educational institutions established in 1959
Buildings and structures in Waterloo, Iowa
Schools in Black Hawk County, Iowa
1959 establishments in Iowa